Elisha B. Seaman (1838 - 12 June 1919) was a corporal in the United States Army who was awarded the Medal of Honor for gallantry during the American Civil War. Seaman was awarded the medal on 24 June 1892 for actions performed at the Battle of Chancellorsville in Virginia on 2 May 1863.

Personal life 
Seaman was born in 1838 in Logan County, Ohio. He fathered two children. He died on 12 June 1919 and was buried in Mount Tabor Church Cemetery in Mingo, Ohio.

Military service 
Seaman enlisted in the Army as a private on 22 October 1861 and was mustered into Company A of the 66th Ohio Infantry. He was promoted to corporal. Seaman's Medal of Honor citation reads:

Seaman was mustered out of the Army on 15 July 1865 in Louisville, Kentucky.

References 

1838 births
1919 deaths
American Civil War recipients of the Medal of Honor
United States Army Medal of Honor recipients
People from Logan County, Ohio